Alasio Sovita Naduva  (born 25 June 1990) plays as a winger in the Fiji national rugby sevens team. He helped the Fiji Sevens side to win their fourth World Rugby Sevens Series in the 2018-19 season. Naduva made his debut in the 2017-18 HSBC World Sevens Series and has quickly established himself as one of the fastest players, hitting a top speed of 36 km per hour suggesting that he is one of the world's fastest rugby players.

Early life 
Naduva is a native of Naweni in the Cakudrove Province in Fiji.

Awards and honours 

 Player of the final Hamilton Sevens

References 

Fiji international rugby sevens players
1990 births
Living people